The Arado Ar 196 was a shipboard reconnaissance low-wing monoplane aircraft built by the German firm of Arado starting in 1936. The next year it was selected as the winner of a design contest and became the standard aircraft of the Kriegsmarine (German Navy) throughout World War II.

Design and development
In 1933, the Kriegsmarine looked for a standardized shipboard observation floatplane. After a brief selection period, the Reichsluftfahrtministerium (German Air Ministry, RLM) decided on the Heinkel He 60 biplane. This was one of a line of developments of a basic biplane airframe that appeared as a number of floatplanes, trainers, and fighters. Deliveries started in a matter of months.

By 1935, it was found that the He 60's performance was lacking and the RLM asked Heinkel to design its replacement. The result was the He 114. The first prototype was powered by the Daimler-Benz DB 600 inline engine, but it was clear that supplies of this engine would be limited and the production versions turned to the BMW 132 radial engine instead.

The plane proved to have only slightly better performance than the He 60, and its sea-handling was poor. Rushed modifications resulted in a series of nine prototypes in an attempt to solve some of the problems, but they did not help much. The Navy gave up, and the planes were eventually sold off to Romania, Spain and Sweden.

In October 1936, the RLM asked for a He 114 replacement. The only stipulations were that it would use the BMW 132, and requested prototypes in both twin-float and single-float configurations. Designs were received from Dornier, Gotha, Arado and Focke-Wulf. Heinkel declined to tender, contending that the He 114 could still be made to work.

With the exception of the Arado low-wing monoplane design, all were conventional biplanes. The Arado was the most modern and capable aircraft, and the RLM ordered four prototypes. The RLM was conservative by nature, so they also ordered two of the Focke-Wulf Fw 62 designs as a backup. It quickly became clear that the Arado would work effectively, and only four prototypes of the Fw 62 were built.

The Ar 196 prototypes were all delivered in summer 1937, V1 (which flew in May) and V2 with twin floats as A models, and V3 and V4 on a single float as B models. Both versions demonstrated excellent water handling and there seemed to be little to decide, one over the other. Since there was a possibility of the smaller outrigger floats on the B models "digging in", the twin-float A model was ordered into production. A single additional prototype, V5, was produced in November 1938 to test final changes.

Ten A-0s were delivered in November and December 1938, with a single 7.92 mm (.312 in) MG 15 machine gun at the rear seat for defence. Five similarly equipped B-0s were also delivered to land-based squadrons. This was followed by 20 A-1 production models starting in June 1939, enough to equip the surface fleet.

Starting in November, production switched to the heavier land-based A-2 model. It added shackles for two 50 kg (110 lb) bombs, two 20 mm MG FF cannon in the wings, and a 7.92 mm (.312 in) MG 17 machine gun in the cowling. The A-4 replaced it in December 1940, strengthening the airframe, adding another radio, and switching propellers to a VDM model. The apparently misnumbered A-3, which had additional strengthening of the airframe, replaced the A-4. The final production version was the A-5 from 1943, which changed radios and cockpit instruments, switched the rear gun to the much-improved MG 81Z with 2000 rounds of ammunition, retrofitted the existing cannon to the MG FF/M with extended 90 round magazines, added armour protection for the pilot and observer and strengthened the airframe. The A-5 also upgraded engine type to BMW 132W. Overall, 541 Ar 196s (15 prototypes and 526 production models) were built before production ended in August 1944, about 100 of these from SNCA and Fokker plants.

The Ar 196C was a proposed aerodynamically-refined version, but the project was cancelled in 1941.

Operational history

The airplane was loved by its pilots, who found that it handled well both in the air and on the water. With the loss of the German surface fleet, the A-1s were added to coastal squadrons and continued to fly reconnaissance missions and submarine hunts into late 1944. Although it was no match for a fighter, it was considerably better than its Allied counterparts, and generally considered the best of its class. Owing to its good handling on water, the Finnish Air Force utilized Ar 196 A-3s which were later upgraded to A-5s in mid-1944 for reconnaissance duties as well as supply runs, several troops could fit inside its fuselage.

Two Arado Ar 196s were brought to Penang in  Japanese-occupied Malaya aboard the auxiliary cruisers Thor and Michel in the early 1940s. In March 1944, along with a Japanese Aichi E13A, these floatplanes formed the newly-created East Asia Naval Special Service to assist both the German Monsun Gruppe and Japanese naval forces in the area. The aircraft were painted in Japanese livery and were operated by Luftwaffe pilots under the command of Oberleutnant Ulrich Horn.

Arado in Allied hands
The first Arado Ar 196 to fall into allied hands was an example belonging to the German cruiser , which was captured in Lyngstad, Eide, by a Norwegian Marinens Flyvebaatfabrikk M.F.11 floatplane of the Trøndelag naval district on 8 April 1940, at the dawn of the Norwegian Campaign. After being towed to Kristiansund by the torpedo boat , it was used against its former owners, flying with Norwegian markings. At 03:30 on 18 April, the Arado was evacuated to the UK by a Royal Norwegian Navy Air Service pilot. The plane was shortly thereafter crashed by a British pilot while on transit to the Helensburgh naval air base for testing. At the end of the war, at least one Arado Ar 196 was left at a Norwegian airfield and kept in use as a liaison aircraft by the Royal Norwegian Air Force for a year on the West coast.

During 1944-45, Soviet forces captured many Arados along the Baltic coast of Poland and Germany. At Dassow a spare parts depot was recovered also. After repairs, thirty-seven Arado Ar 196 aircraft fitted with Soviet radio equipment were integrated into the aviation element of the Soviet Border Guard. They were sent to Baltic, Black Sea and Pacific coastal areas, serving until 1955. Some Soviet 196s were re-engined with an M-621 R radial engine, driving a VISh-21 propeller

Operators

 Bulgarian Air Force

 Finnish Air Force

 Kriegsmarine
 Luftwaffe
 – (captured)
 Royal Norwegian Navy Air Service

 Soviet Border Guard

Aircraft on display
Ar 196 A-5 (originally A-3) Werknummer 196 0219
An aircraft operated by the Bulgarian Air Force is displayed at the Museum of Aviation, Plovdiv, Bulgaria.
Ar 196 A-5, Werknummer 623 167
An aircraft that formerly equipped the German cruiser  is in storage at the Paul Garber Facility of the Smithsonian's National Air and Space Museum, and awaiting restoration.
Ar 196 A-5, Werknummer 623 183
The upper fuselage and canopy were damaged during transit, and it remained in storage awaiting restoration. In December 2012, it was packed into containers and shipped to Nordholz, Germany. Restoration began in August 2013, in time for that city's celebration for 100 years of German naval aviation. The plane, on long term loan from the National Naval Aviation Museum, will eventually be displayed at the Naval Air Wing 3 (Marinefliegergeschwader 3) headquarters at Nordholz Naval Airbase.
Arado Ar 196 A-2 Werknummer 196 0046 or 196 0048
The Aircraft Historical Museum, Sola, Norway, has on display an Ar 196 A-2 fuselage frame raised from the wreck of the German cruiser Blücher in Oslofjord.

Another aircraft is known to lie in the Jonsvatnet, a lake near Trondheim in Norway. A number of wartime German aircraft have been recovered from the lake, but the Ar 196 remains undisturbed as its crew were killed when it crashed there in 1940 and it has the status of a war grave.

A wrecked Arado Ar 196 A-3, believed to be D1 + EH, was snagged by a fishing trawler off the island of Irakleia in 1982 at a depth of 91 meters. It was towed out of the fishing lanes to shallower waters (about 11 meters). The upside-down plane, with fuselage and wings mostly intact, has become a popular spot for scuba diving.

Specifications (Ar 196 A-5)

See also

References

Notes

Bibliography

 Dabrowski, Hans-Peter and Koos, Volker. Arado Ar 196, Germany's Multi-Purpose Seaplane. Atglen, PA: Schiffer Publishing, 1997. .
 Ledwoch, Janusz. Arado 196 (Militaria 53) (in Polish). Warszawa, Poland: Wydawnictwo Militaria, 1997. .

External links

Single-engined tractor aircraft
Low-wing aircraft
1930s German military reconnaissance aircraft
Floatplanes
Ar 196
Aircraft first flown in 1937